Lottie is a feminine given name, often a diminutive for Charlotte or Lieselotte. It may refer to:

People
Lottie (name)

Places
 Lottie, Louisiana, United States, an unincorporated community
 Lottie Lake, Canadian hamlet
 3489 Lottie, a main-belt asteroid

Other
Lottie Dolls, children's fashion dolls made by Arklu Ltd.
The Lottie Project, a 1997 children's novel by Jacqueline Wilson
Lottie Sleigh, an 1852 sailing barque
Severe Tropical Cyclone Lottie, a deadly 1973 Australian region cyclone that was originally named Natalie
Lottie (file format), file format for vectorial graphics

See also

 
 Lott (disambiguation)
 Lotte (disambiguation)
 Lotti, a list of people with the surname

Feminine given names
Lists of people by nickname